Baron Theophil Edvard von Hansen (original Danish name: Theophilus Hansen ; 13 July 1813 – 17 February 1891) was a Danish architect who later became an Austrian citizen. He became particularly well known for his buildings and structures in Athens and Vienna, and is considered an outstanding representative of Neoclassicism and Historicism.

Biography
Hansen was born in Copenhagen. After training with Prussian architect Karl Friedrich Schinkel and some years studying in Vienna, he moved to Athens in 1837, where he studied architecture and design, with a concentration and interest in Byzantine architecture. During his stay in Athens, Hansen designed his first building, the National Observatory of Athens and two of the three contiguous buildings forming the so-called "Athenian Trilogy": the Academy of Athens and the National Library of Greece, the third building of the trilogy being the National and Capodistrian University of Athens, which was designed by his brother Hans Christian Hansen (1803–1883).

The Greek-Austrian entrepreneur Georgios Sinas (1783-1856, who donated the observatory, called Hansen to Vienna in 1846, where Hansen took up an apprenticeship with noted Austrian architect Ludwig Förster (1797–1863).
In his early works, such as the museum at The Arsenal in Vienna, Hansen was still rather aligned to a more romantic style. In later years, he became the most outstanding representative of Renaissance-inspired historicism (Neo-Renaissance), which also came to be known as Viennese-style. This style extended into the smallest details of the interior design and partially accepted the courses of a synthesis of the arts.

Along with Förster and many others, Hansen was one of the most important and influential architects of the Viennese Ringstraße. His most famous work is the Austrian Parliament building, which was created in the style of an ancient, neo-classic temple, and serves to refer to the Greek beginnings of democracy.  Hansen was originally a staunch critic of the Classical style that was taught to him at the Copenhagen Academy.  Over the years, however, he came to incorporate Classical elements into his forms. Bauleiter on this project was Swiss-Austrian architect Hans Auer (1847–1906) who would go on to win the competition for the Swiss Bundeshaus.

Hansen's famed Musikverein in Vienna is one of the most notable concert halls in the world; a concert hall whose design and acoustics are often admired and copied in present-day music houses.

Hansen worked together with Austrian sculptor Vincenz Pilz (1816-1896) and artist Carl Rahl (1812–1865),  as well as with architect Otto Wagner (1841-1918).

In 1884 Emperor Franz Joseph honoured Hansen with a barony in the Austrian nobility and he was since styled "Freiherr von Hansen".

He died in 1891 in Vienna.

Work

 National Observatory of Athens, 1842
 House of military invalids, Lviv, 1851-1863
 Academy of Athens, Athens, starting from 1856
 Museum of Military History in the Arsenal, Vienna, 1856
 Old Municipal Hospital in Patras, Greece, 1857
 Cemetery chapel Christuskirche at the Matzleinsdorf Protestant Cemetery, Vienna, 1858
 Holy Trinity Greek Orthodox Church, Vienna, 1858–1861
 Palais Todesco, Ringstrasse, Vienna, 1861-1864
 Palace of Archduke Wilhelm, Vienna, 1864–1868
 Musikverein, Vienna, 1867–1870
 Academy of Fine Arts Vienna, 1871–1876
 Philharmonic Concert Hall, Brno, 1871–1873
 Vienna Stock Exchange, 1874–1877
 Austrian Parliament Building, Vienna, 1874–1883
 Zappeion, Athens, 1874-1888
 New Lutheran church, Kežmarok, 1879-1892
 Castle Nadelburg, Lichtenwörth, Lower Austria 1880-1882
 National Library of Greece, Athens, starting from 1888

Gallery

References

Other sources 
 George Niemann (Hrsg.), Ferdinand von Feldegg: Theophilus Hansen und seine Werke. A. Schroll & Co., Wien 1893.
 Renate Wagner-Rieger and Mara Reissberger (1980(  Theophil von Hansen. (Series: Die Wiener Ringstraße VIII; Band 4) Wiesbaden: Steiner  
 Manfred Leithe-Jasper: Hansen, Theophilos Edvard Freiherr von. In: Neue Deutsche Biographie (NDB). Band 7, Duncker & Humblot, Berlin 1966, S. 634 f.
 Julius Leisching: Hansen, Theophilos Edvard Freiherr von. In: Allgemeine Deutsche Biographie (ADB). Band 49, Duncker & Humblot, Leipzig 1904, S. 762–766.
 Hansen Theophil Edvard Frh. von. In: Österreichisches Biographisches Lexikon 1815–1950 (ÖBL). Band 2, Verlag der Österreichischen Akademie der Wissenschaften, Wien 1959, S. 181 f. 
 Alice Strobl: Das k. k. Waffenmuseum im Arsenal. Der Bau und seine künstlerische Ausschmückung, in: Schriften des Heeresgeschichtlichen Museums in Wien, herausgegeben von der Direktion. Graz / Köln, 1961
 Robert Bachtrögl: Die Nadelburg - Geschichte ab 1747. 2010 (Theophil Hansen ab S.77)
 Adolf Stiller (Hrsg).: Theophil Hansen - Klassische Eleganz im Alltag. Müry Salzmann, Salzburg / Wien 2013, .
 Andreas Pittler, Hermann Schnell: Der Baumeister des Parliaments - Theophil Hansen (1813-1891). Edition Winkler-Hermaden, Wien 2013,

Notes

External links
 

1813 births
1891 deaths
Barons of Austria
Austrian people of Danish descent
Danish expatriates in Austria
Danish neoclassical architects
Burials at the Vienna Central Cemetery
Architects from Copenhagen
Recipients of the Royal Gold Medal
People associated with the Academy of Fine Arts Vienna
 
Architecture of Athens
19th-century Danish architects